The Reliable-Dayton was a High wheeler American automobile manufactured in Chicago, Illinois, from 1906 to 1909.  The car was built in a factory  that would later be the home of the Fal-Car.

History 
Reliable Dayton high-wheelers appeared in the spring of 1906 and William O. Dayton organized the Dayton Motor Car Company in the late fall.  All engines for the Reliable Dayton were built at the Dayton & Mashey Automobile Works in Chicago which William Dayton also ran. The original engine was a two-stroke twin-cylinder 15-hp engine later changed to a four-stroke twin engine.

The high-wheelers had a rope drive and solid rubber tires, with the engine located under the seat.  The first cars had a fin-tube radiator over the front axle, while later models had a Renault style hood in front housing the gasoline and water tanks.  The cars were available as a surrey, runabout or an enclosed coupe. Prices in 1908 ranged from $780 for the runabout to $925 for the surrey,and to $1,200 for the coupe.

During 1909 the Reliable Dayton factory was taken over by the Fal Motor Company for production of the F.A.L. automobile.  William O. Dayton, was also associated with the Matrix, Dayton, Crusader and New Era automobiles in Joliet, Illinois from 1912 to 1916.

Gallery

See also 
 1909 Reliable Dayton Model F at ConceptCarz
 High wheeler
 Brass Era car

References

Defunct motor vehicle manufacturers of the United States
Defunct manufacturing companies based in Illinois
Vehicle manufacturing companies established in 1906
Vehicle manufacturing companies disestablished in 1909
Motor vehicle manufacturers based in Illinois
Highwheeler
Brass Era vehicles
1900s cars
Cars introduced in 1906